The First Peoples National Party of Canada (FPNPC) was a registered federal political party in Canada.  It intended to advance the lives of the Indigenous peoples in Canada getting involved in the federal electoral process, engage the public on Indigenous issues, and calledd on the grassroots to get involved by nominating candidates for election in electoral districts with large Aboriginal populations. The party ran candidates in 3 federal elections between 2006 and 2011. The party was voluntarily deregistered by Elections Canada on July 5, 2013, with then-leader Will Morin asserting that the party's purpose had been supplanted by the emergence of the Idle No More activist movement.

Background
The FPNPC held its first organizational meeting in October 2004 in Sault Ste. Marie, Ontario. The similarly-minded Aboriginal Peoples Party of Canada began organizing independently in the summer of 2005.  Although the parties contrasted somewhat in their desire to work closely with or at arm's length from national aboriginal organizations such as the Assembly of First Nations, it was  believed that the two parties merged their applications for registration to facilitate gaining Elections Canada recognition.  One of the conditions of that agreement was a national convention in which the party's name would be put to the membership for a vote.

In the fall of 2005 the FPNP filed its application for registration as a political party. The party nominated five candidates in Alberta, British Columbia and Ontario in the 2006 federal election. On December 26, 2005, Will Morin, an Ojibway from Michipicoten First Nation was the first of the 5 candidates to be officially registered by Elections Canada. This registration, during a federal election, made the FPNP an official political party.

Barbara Wardlaw, an Ojibwa from the Michipicoten First Nation near Sault Ste. Marie, served as the party's interim leader in the 2006 and 2008 elections. She was succeeded by Will Morin, who also served as leader on an interim basis. Morin was the party's only candidate in the 2011 election, receiving 0.50 percent of the votes in the riding of Sudbury.

Election results

See also

List of political parties in Canada

References

External links
First Peoples National Party of Canada – Canadian Political Parties and Political Interest Groups – Web Archive created by the University of Toronto Libraries

Federal political parties in Canada
Indigenous politics in Canada
Political parties of minorities
Indigenist political parties in North America
Political parties established in 2004
Political parties disestablished in 2013
2004 establishments in Canada
2013 disestablishments in Canada